Rollo's Wild Oat is a 1920 comedic play by Clare Kummer.

Background
The play first had some tryout runs, including in upstate New York and Philadelphia in January-February 1920,New Kummer Play Has Sparkling Lines, Evening Public Ledger, p. 13 col 2. but a middling reception delayed a planned Broadway debut.  Originally slated for the Selwyns, they lost confidence in it and gave it up, and Kummer decided to finance it herself.

The play debuted at the smaller venue 300 seat Punch and Judy Theatre on Broadway on November 23, 1920.  It was a decent success and ran into June 1921 for a total run of 228 performances.  

Critic Burns Mantle's annual review of plays called it "a smartly written and splendidly entertaining little comedy ... in which Roland Young's performance was highly commended."  Alexander Woollcott deemed it "a kind of airy and capricious nonsense which was familiar enough in the best of Oscar Wilde."  Writing for New York Tribune, Heywood Broun wrote "the best of it seems to us to be the finest work which Miss Kummer has yet done for the theatre, which means that it is far and away beyond the capacity of any other American writer of light comedy, with the possible exception of Booth Tarkington.  Mingled with this is other materials which is distinctly dull."  But while Broun believed plot was almost superfluous to Kummer's best writing, the New York Herald found that despite "flashes of that whimsical wit,"  the play "was suggestive in more ways that one last night of entertaining amateur theatricals" and the "dramatic crisis" of the play was "quite flat."  Charles Darnton of the New York World was much kinder, writing that the play "reaped whirlwinds of laughter and won new laurels" for Kummer, and praised Roland Young's performance.

The play was popular in stock productions into the 1940s.  The Metropolitan Playhouse put on a revival of the play in 2014.

Original Broadway cast
In order of appearance
 Ivan Simpson as Hewston
 Marjorie Kummer as Lydia
 Roland Young as Rollo Webster
 Dore Davidson as Mr. Stein
 Lotus Robb as Goldie MacDuff
 Edythe Tressider as Mrs. Park Gales
 J. Palmer Collins as Whortley Camperdown
 Manuel A. Alexander as Thomas Skitterling
 Stanley Howlett as George Lucus
 Grace Peters as Aunt Lane
 J.M. Kerrigan as Horatio Webster
 Elinor Cox as Bella

Kummer's daughter Marjorie was in the cast, in her stage debut.  She married her castmate Roland Young in 1921.

References

External links
 
 Rollo's Wild Oat: A Comedy In Three Acts (1922 Samuel French, via Google Books)

1920 plays
Broadway plays